Park Do-Hun (born March 20, 1964) is a male South Korean former handball player who competed in the 1988 Summer Olympics and in the 1992 Summer Olympics.

In 1988 he won the silver medal with the South Korean team. He played all six matches and scored 21 goals.

Four years later he finished sixth with the South Korean team in the 1992 Olympic tournament. He played all six matches again and scored eleven goals.

External links
profile

1964 births
Living people
South Korean male handball players
Olympic handball players of South Korea
Handball players at the 1988 Summer Olympics
Handball players at the 1992 Summer Olympics
Olympic silver medalists for South Korea
Olympic medalists in handball
Asian Games medalists in handball
Handball players at the 1986 Asian Games
Handball players at the 1990 Asian Games
Medalists at the 1988 Summer Olympics
Asian Games gold medalists for South Korea
Medalists at the 1986 Asian Games
Medalists at the 1990 Asian Games